In enzymology, a serine-phosphoethanolamine synthase is an enzyme that catalyzes the chemical reaction

CDP-ethanolamine + L-serine  CMP + L-serine-phosphoethanolamine

Thus, the two substrates of this enzyme are CDP-ethanolamine and L-serine, whereas its two products are CMP and L-serine-phosphoethanolamine.

This enzyme belongs to the family of transferases, specifically those transferring non-standard substituted phosphate groups.  The systematic name of this enzyme class is CDP-ethanolamine:L-serine ethanolamine phosphotransferase. Other names in common use include serine ethanolamine phosphate synthetase, serine ethanolamine phosphodiester synthase, serine ethanolaminephosphotransferase, serine-phosphinico-ethanolamine synthase, and serinephosphoethanolamine synthase.  This enzyme participates in glycerophospholipid metabolism.

References

 

EC 2.7.8
Enzymes of unknown structure